La Chapelle-Saint-Aubert is a commune in the Ille-et-Vilaine department in Brittany in northwestern France.

Geography

The communes bordering are Saint-Sauveur-des-Landes, Romagné, Billé, Vendel, Saint-Jean-sur-Couesnon and Saint-Marc-sur-Couesnon.

Population

See also
Communes of the Ille-et-Vilaine department

References

External links

 The commune on infobretagne.com
 

Communes of Ille-et-Vilaine